Alison Stone (born 1972) is a British philosopher. She is a Professor of European Philosophy in the Department of Politics, Philosophy and Religion at Lancaster University, UK.

Career 
Stone has a D.Phil. from the University of Sussex on Hegel and feminist philosophy, and before joining Lancaster University in 2002 she held a temporary lectureship and a research fellowship at Cambridge University.

Stone writes about feminist philosophy, continental European philosophy and the history of philosophy. She is the author of nine books and numerous articles on feminism, German Idealism, Theodor Adorno, Luce Irigaray, Judith Butler,philosophy of nature, women in philosophy, and various other topics. One of her most frequently viewed articles on Academia.edu is on 'Essentialism and Anti-Essentialism in Feminist Philosophy'.  She has also written a book on philosophy and popular music. Most recently she has been working on women in nineteenth-century philosophy, especially in Britain, including the philosopher Frances Power Cobbe as well as others such as Harriet Martineau and Anna Jameson. Stone previously co-edited the journal the Hegel Bulletin and was an interim co-editor of Hypatia.

Works 
Her books have been reviewed by Notre Dame Philosophical Reviews, The Journal of Speculative Philosophy, the Review of Metaphysics, and APA Newsletters

Selected publications

Petrified Intelligence: Nature in Hegel’s Philosophy (2004, SUNY Press) 
Luce Irigaray and the Philosophy of Sexual Difference (2006, Cambridge UP)
An Introduction to Feminist Philosophy (2007, Polity Press)
The Edinburgh Critical History of Nineteenth-Century Philosophy (2011, Edinburgh UP)
Feminism, Psychoanalysis, and Maternal Subjectivity (2012, Routledge)
The Value of Popular Music: An Approach from Post-Kantian Aesthetics (2016, Palgrave Macmillan).
The Routledge Companion to Feminist Philosophy, co-edited with Ann Garry and Serene Khader (2017, Taylor and Francis)
Nature, Ethics and Gender in German Romanticism and Idealism (2018, Rowman & Littlefield International)
Being Born: Birth and Philosophy (2019, Oxford UP)
Frances Power Cobbe: Essential Writings of a Nineteenth-Century Feminist Philosopher (2021, Oxford New Histories of Philosophy series, Oxford UP) 
Frances Power Cobbe (2022, Cambridge Elements in Women in the History of Philosophy, Cambridge UP)

References

External links 
 
 Alison Stone on Academia.edu
 Hegel, Irigaray, Motherhood & Feminist Philosophy, Richard Marshall's interview with Alison Stone, in 3:AM Magazine, via 3:16AM, Marshall's philosophy interviews blog

Living people
Academics of Lancaster University
Alumni of the University of Sussex
British philosophers
Philosophy journal editors
British women philosophers
1972 births
21st-century British philosophers
20th-century British philosophers
Feminist philosophers